The Windham Exempted Village School District is the public school district for the village of Windham and Windham Township in Portage County in the U.S. state of Ohio. The district was founded as the Windham School Company by act of the Ohio Legislature (O.L., XXVIII, 93) on February 18, 1830.  The district has one high school, Windham High School; and one elementary school, Katherine Thomas Elementary School.

History
In 1835, the Windham School Company founded Windham Academy as the 44th institution of secondary education in Ohio.  The academy held classes in the building now known as the Brick Chapel in Windham.  Windham Academy operated for 18 years, and produced at least one notable graduate:  Laurin D. Woodworth, former Representative for Ohio's 17th congressional district.  In the 1860s, two new elementary schools were founded in Windham, and the schools were connected to the nascent Ohio State Board of Education. In 1883, these schools produced their first high school graduates.

References

External links
District website

School districts in Ohio
Education in Portage County, Ohio
School districts established in 1830
1830 establishments in Ohio